The men's tournament competition of the beach volleyball events at the 2015 Pan American Games took place between 13 and 21 of July at the Chevrolet Beach Volleyball Centre. The defending Pan American Games champions are Alison Cerutti and Emanuel Rego of Brazil.

Each of the 16 pairs in the tournament will be placed in one of four groups of four teams apiece, and play a round-robin within that pool. The top two teams in each pool advance to the Quarterfinals. The third along with the fourth-placed teams in each group, will be eliminated.

The 8 teams that advanced to the elimination rounds will play a single-elimination tournament with a bronze-medal match between the semifinal losers.

Schedule

Results

Preliminary round
All times are Central Standard Time (UTC−06:00)

Group A

|}

Group B

|}

Group C

|}

Group D

|}

Elimination stage

13th to 16th round

Elimination round

9th to 12th round

Quarterfinals

Semifinals

5th to 8th round

Finals

15th to 16th round

13th to 14th round

11th to 12th round

9th to 10th round

7th to 8th round

5th to 6th round

Bronze-medal match

Gold-medal match

Final standings

References

Beach volleyball at the 2015 Pan American Games